Idaea ostentaria, the showy wave, is a species of geometrid moth in the family Geometridae.

The MONA or Hodges number for Idaea ostentaria is 7121.

References

Further reading

 
 

Sterrhini
Articles created by Qbugbot
Moths described in 1861